Gornja Gračanica (Cyrillic: Горња Грачаница) is a village in the City of Zenica, Bosnia and Herzegovina.

Demographics 
According to the 2013 census, its population was 847.

References

Populated places in Zenica